The Roman Catholic Diocese of Siuna was erected on 30 November 2017.

History 
 November 30, 2017: Established as Roman Catholic Diocese of Siuna, on territory split off from the Vicariate Apostolic of Bluefields.

Ordinaries
David Albin Zywiec Sidor, O.F.M. Cap. (2017–2020)
Isidoro del Carmen Mora Ortega, (2021–)

See also
Roman Catholic dioceses of Nicaragua

External links and references

Specific

Roman Catholic dioceses in Nicaragua
Christian organizations established in 2017
Roman Catholic dioceses and prelatures established in the 21st century
2017 establishments in Nicaragua